Frozen Stiff is a 2002 Yugoslav comedy film directed by Milorad Milinković. The film is about two brothers trying to transport their dead grandfather to his hometown, but lose him in the process and try to find him back before the funeral.

Cast

References

External links 

2002 comedy films
2002 films
Serbian comedy films
Yugoslav comedy films
Films set in Serbia
Films set in Vojvodina
2000s Serbian-language films